Ahmad Tavakkoli (born 5 March 1951) is an Iranian conservative and principlist politician, journalist. He is currently member of the Expediency Discernment Council. Also he is currently managing-director of Alef news website and founder of the corruption watchdog, non-governmental organization Justice and Transparency Watch.

Tavakkoli is the former representative of Tehran, Rey, Shemiranat and Eslamshahr electoral district in the parliament and the director of Majlis Research Center.

Career
Tavakkoli was the minister of labour under Mir-Hossein Mousavi, a parliament representative from Behshahr, and a presidential candidate in two of the presidential elections in Iran (running against Ali Akbar Hashemi Rafsanjani and Mohammad Khatami).

Tavakkoli temporarily left politics after the leftists oppositions forced him out of the ministry of labour. He founded Resalat, a conservative newspaper, and later left Iran to study economics in the UK, where he received his PhD.

Views and personal life
Tavakkoli is a critic of a capitalist economy, and backs the government's role in controlling the economy. He is a cousin of the Larijani brothers, including Ali Larijani and Mohammad Javad Larijani.

Tavakkoli was also a fierce critic of President Ahmadinejad. On 2 March 2011, the PBS' Tehran Bureau reported that Tavakkoli criticized the then President for mentioning only Iran and not Islam in recent speeches.

Electoral history

References

External links

1951 births
Living people
Deputies of Tehran, Rey, Shemiranat and Eslamshahr
Government ministers of Iran
Candidates for President of Iran
Iranian prosecutors
Candidates in the 2001 Iranian presidential election
Spokespersons of the Government of Iran
Members of the 1st Islamic Consultative Assembly
Members of the 7th Islamic Consultative Assembly
Members of the 8th Islamic Consultative Assembly
Members of the 9th Islamic Consultative Assembly
Alumni of the University of Nottingham
Alliance of Builders of Islamic Iran politicians
Front of Transformationalist Principlists politicians
Iranian anti-corruption activists
Iranian news website owners (people)
Islamic Republican Party politicians
Mojahedin of the Islamic Revolution Organization politicians
People from Behshahr